The Government Radio Network (GRN) is a network of various systems in place across Australia that enable statewide trunked radio communication. The network operates through inter-linked sites for government and public services such as police, ambulance, fire, or roads authorities which require such a system to function properly. The main aim of the GRN is to consolidate all resources into one network, ensuring greater coverage and reliability than if each department had its own independent communication system. The existence of the GRN also reduces the amount of government money and resources needed to maintain communication between units of emergency and public service branches. Last, it allows effective intercommunication among these services in times of national or state emergency for coordination of wide-scale actions.

Australian Capital Territory Radio Network (TRN)

The Australian Capital Territory Radio Network (commonly referred to as the TRN) is a trunked radio system operating in the Australian Capital Territory, Australia. The network was introduced in 2004, and provides 100% coverage of the ACT. The network is used by ACT Emergency Services Agencies (ESA) and other ACT Government agencies including ACTION buses, TAMS (Territory and Municipal Services), ACT Health and Roads ACT.

The network is part of the NSW GRN, and is controlled and maintained as part of that network. It is managed separately by the ACT Government.

New South Wales Public Safety Network (NSW PSN)

Overview
The New South Wales Public Safety Network (previously referred to as the New South Wales Government Radio Network or NSW GRN) is a trunked radio system operating in the state of New South Wales, Australia. Established in 1993, the network was the first government trunked radio network in Australia and is one of the largest in the world. The NSW GRN covers more than 80% of New South Wales and approximately 96% of the urban population. The network is owned by the NSW Government through the NSW Telco Authority and the network's operations are managed under contract.

Network Users
The network is used by all NSW and ACT emergency services in varying capacities, along with other agencies, departments, services, and non-government organisations, including:

Fire & Rescue New South Wales
New South Wales Ambulance
NSW Rural Fire Service
New South Wales State Emergency Service
New South Wales Police Force
ACT Emergency Services
Department of Attorney General and Justice
RailCorp
Roads & Maritime Services (formally Roads & Traffic Authority and NSW Maritime)
Sydney Ferries
Department of Corrective Services
NSW Department of Juvenile Justice
NSW National Parks & Wildlife Service
Ausgrid
Endeavour Energy
Hunter Water Corporation
Sydney Water
WaterNSW
Property NSW
Sydney Ports Corporation
Central Tablelands County Councils
Sutherland Shire Council
Child Flight
Australian Broadcasting Corporation
Chevra Hatzolah (Jewish Community sponsored and staffed medical response)

The network is also used by other government departments and discrete law enforcement agencies.

Network Information

The network is a digital 9600 bps Project 25 (commonly referred to as P25 or APCO-25) Phase 2 trunked radio system operating in the UHF band between 403 MHz and 430 MHz in 12.5 kHz steps. End user equipment is supplied mostly by Motorola, and consists primarily of the APX series mobile and portable two-way radios, the XTL series mobile and XTS series portable radios (although Benelec, Tait Communications and Simoco radios are also authorised for use). Encryption is supported and used by some agencies on the network.

Northern Territory Emergency Services Trunk Network (NTESTN)

The Northern Territory Emergency Services Trunk Network is a trunked radio system operating in the Northern Territory, Australia. The network is a digital Project 25 Phase 1 trunked radio system operating in the lower UHF band.

Queensland Government Wireless Network (GWN)

Overview
The Queensland Government Wireless Network (referred to as the GWN) is a trunked radio system operating in the state of Queensland, Australia. The network was built and is currently managed by Telstra under contract. The network commenced operation in 2014, and was operational for the 2014 G20 summit in Brisbane. Following that event, the network was re-purposed and is now the main communications network for emergency services in South East Queensland.

Network Users
The network provides secure radio communications for Queensland's public safety agencies. These users include:

Queensland Ambulance Service
Queensland Fire and Emergency Services
Queensland Police Service
Queensland State Emergency Service

Network Information

The network is a digital Project 25 (known as P25 or APCO-25) Phase 2 trunked radio system operating in the UHF band. End user equipment is supplied by Motorola. Encryption is used by all network users.

South Australia Government Radio Network (SAGRN)

Overview
The SA Government Radio Network (referred to as the SAGRN) is a trunked radio system operating in the state of South Australia, Australia

The SAGRN is one of the largest and most comprehensive public safety networks in the world, covering over 265,000 square kilometres and providing coverage to more than 99.5% of South Australia’s population including 20km offshore coverage along the State's coast.

The SAGRN includes a statewide Paging network that is used for the dispatch of Ambulance, MFS, CFS and SES resources. The Paging network is integrated with the Computer Aided Dispatch system used at the Triple Zero Emergency Operations Centres.

Telstra originally constructed the SAGRN in the early 2000's, the network replaced 28 separate systems. Telstra supported the network until 2010.

In 2010, Motorola entered into a contract with the South Australian Government to support the SAGRN.

In 2015, Motorola entered into contracts to upgrade the SAGRN and operate it.

Network Users

The SAGRN is used by over 25 government and non-government agencies including 

SA Ambulance Service
South Australia Police
South Australian Metropolitan Fire Service
South Australian Country Fire Service
South Australian State Emergency Service
SA Water
SA Power Networks
Adelaide Metro
Department for Correctional Services
Royal Flying Doctor Service of Australia
St John Ambulance Australia
Surf Life Saving Australia

The network is also used by other government departments and law enforcement agencies.

Network Information

The SAGRN Voice Network is a digital Project 25 (known as P25 or APCO-25) Phase 1 trunked radio system operating in the Harmonised Government Spectrum  in the UHF band.

The SAGRN Voice network is built on Motorola Astro-25 network equipment.

P25 Voice terminal equipment is supplied via a panel of suppliers of compatible P25 radios.

Tasmanian Government Radio Network (TasGRN)
The Tasmanian Government Radio Network (TasGRN) is a project to establish a single digital communications network for a number of Tasmanian government organisations.

Victorian Government Radio Networks

Melbourne Metropolitan Radio (MMR)
The Metropolitan Mobile Radio (MMR) service is a Project 25 (APCO-25) Phase 1 radio voice communications system. It provides communications over the Greater Metropolitan area supporting Victoria Police, Ambulance Victoria and the Metropolitan Fire and Emergency Services Board.

The current users are limited to Emergency Services which are:
 Victoria Police (encrypted)
 Ambulance Victoria (encrypted as of July 2019)
 Fire Rescue Victoria
 Victoria State Emergency Service

All digital scanning receivers are able to decode the unencrypted conventional P25 channels. End user equipment is supplied by Motorola, primarily XTS5000 portables and XTL5000 mobiles.

Regional Mobile Radio (RMR)
The Regional Mobile Radio (RMR) network is a digital VHF P25 (Phase I & II) trunking network managed by Telstra Corporation. The RMR was initially designed as the Regional Radio Dispatch Service (RRDS) Project for the Country Fire Authority (CFA).

Towards the end of June 2013 the first two trunking sites were switched on for the RMR with all CFA bridges transitioned by August 2014 to the RMR that will become the primary communications system for contacting fire dispatchers used by the CFA. Augmenting its older Analogue VHF Network the RMR network is being used for incident dispatching and emergency communications with statewide fire dispatchers with the older analogue VHF network being slowly decommissioned or repurposed and analogue simplex radio communications being used for local and fire ground radio communications.

In 2016, it was announced that regional Victoria Police would transition to the network with encryption. The transition was successfully completed to encrypted communications on the morning of 20 November 2018. The Victoria State Emergency Services, Life Saving Victoria and Corrections Victoria will also transition.

The current users of the network are:
 Victoria Police (Encrypted)
 Country Fire Authority
 Victoria State Emergency Service
 Life Saving Victoria
 Corrections Victoria

The current end user equipment used by the CFA is supplied by Tait Communications and consists of custom CFA branded TM9100s and TP9100s.

Victorian StateNet Mobile Radio Network (SMR)
The Victorian StateNet Mobile Radio network is a MPT1327 trunked radio system owned by the Victorian Government Department of Treasury and Finance and managed by Telstra Corporation.

It consists of 101 base sites which are strategically positioned to provide 96% coverage of the state to its users. PSTN interconnect features are available, with calls possible from radio to mobile telephones & landlines and vice versa.

Frequency allocation for this network start at 163.0625 MHz to 165.6875Mhz (channel spacing of 12.5 kHz).

There are many government and commercial users of this network, some of which include:
 Telstra
 Yarra Valley Water
 City West Water
 AusNet Services
 V/Line
 Sheriff's Office
 FFMV (Forest Fire Management Victoria), comprising Department of Environment and Primary Industries, and Parks Victoria
 VicRoads
 Numerous Taxi Companies
 State Emergency Service (Migrated to RMR)
 Country Fire Authority (Migrated to RMR)
 State Aircraft Unit
The network was recently upgraded by Tait Communications to give users access to a web-portal based reports system called Telstra Hosted Online Reporting (THOR). This feature allows users to track their individual network usage in greater detail.

While a small number of users employ analog frequency inversion voice scrambling, the vast majority of voice traffic on the network is clear.

There are no commercially available scanning receivers able to directly track MPT1327 networks, following voice conversations is possible using freely available decoding software such as Trunkview and a compatible scanner.

Most of the current end user equipment is supplied by Motorola and consists primarily of MCS2000s, MTS2000s, MCX760s and PTX760s.

Western Australia Police Radio Network 

The Western Australia Police Radio Network is an encrypted Project 25 (APCO-25) Phase 1 digital trunked radio system operating in Western Australia. The network commenced operation in 2011, and currently provides coverage to 20,000 square kilometres around Perth, and 25,000 square kilometres around regional areas, equating to 95% of the WA population. The network is used by WA Police and the Department of Justice.

In December 2020, the state government announced plans for a new emergency services radio network.

References

External links
NSW Government Radio Network website
NSW GRN Scan Information
NSW GRN Radio Reference Page
QLD GWN Radio Reference Page

Communications in Australia
Law enforcement in Australia